Suzana Gâdea (1919–1996) was a Romanian politician (Communist).

She served as Minister of Education in 1976–1979.

References

1919 births

1996 deaths

20th-century Romanian women politicians

20th-century Romanian politicians
Romanian communists
Women government ministers of Romania